The Madsen M-50 or M/50 is a submachine gun introduced in 1950. It was produced by the Danish company Dansk Industri Syndikat of Copenhagen, Denmark. The company was colloquially known as Madsen after its founder Vilhelm Herman Oluf Madsen.

Overview
This firearm was a modified variation of the M/46. The only major improvement was the simplified retracting handle.  Introduction of the M/50 occurred on November 7, 1950, at Mosede, Denmark, until 1953.

The M/50 is made of stamped sheet metal. It is an open bolt design which means it fires when the bolt is in the locked back open position with a fixed firing pin. The M/46 and M/50 share a unique design: the firearm is stamped from two pieces of sheet metal which are shaped with an integral rear pistol grip and magazine housing. The two pieces fit together like a clam shell with the hinge at the rear of the pistol grip. The firearm is held together with a barrel locking nut which is threaded onto the fore section of the two receiver halves. The pistol grip is hollow, providing storage space for a magazine loading tool.

The folding stock is made of tubular steel covered with leather and folds onto the right side of the firearm. The M/50 fires in full-auto only. It also features a safety lever (also known as grip safety), unusually placed in front of the forward magazine housing. To fire the M/50 the operator must grip the magazine housing and hold down the safety lever.

Users

 
 (produced under license as the INA Model 953 in .45 ACP)

 

: the M-50 underwent intensive trials in 1951–1952 against the BSA model 1949 and the Sterling submachine gun. The latter was eventually selected.
 In use with Green Berets serving alongside Montagnards in MIKE Force units 

Non State Users

Malayan Communist Party
Ulster Defence Association
Red Hand Commando
Loyalist Volunteer Force

In Popular Culture
In the 1968 movie Ice Station Zebra, the Soviet paratroopers attacking the American naval and Marine force at the research station were armed with the M-50.

In the Season 2, Episode 25 episode of Star Trek, "Bread and Circuses," Captain Kirk uses a Madsen to shoot out the lock of the cell holding Mr. Spock and Dr. McCoy. The Roman soldiers were armed with Madsen M-50s and attempted to shoot the landing party with them as they were transported back to the Enterprise.

References

Nelson, Thomas B. The World's Submachine Guns.  International small arms publishers: Cologne, Germany, 1963.

External links
 Madsen M1946 / M1950 / M1953 at Modern Firearms

Submachine guns of Denmark
9mm Parabellum submachine guns
Products introduced in 1950